Renée Martel (26 June 1947 – 18 December 2021) was a French Canadian country singer. Her father was country singer Marcel Martel.

She died from pneumonia on 18 December 2021, at the age of 74.

References

External links
 
 
 Entry at thecanadianencyclopedia.ca

1947 births
2021 deaths
Canadian women country singers
French-language singers of Canada
People from Drummondville
French Quebecers
Singers from Quebec